The Noble Savage was an American literary magazine which existed between 1960 and 1962. The magazine was founded by Saul Bellow and Jack Ludwig. They also edited the magazine of which the publisher was Meridian Books based in Cleveland, Ohio. Later Keith Botsford joined the magazine as the editor.

The first issue which was published in Spring 1960 contained works by Harold Rosenberg, John Berryman and Ralph Ellison. Later issues included the work by Thomas Pynchon, Robert Coover and Arthur Miller. The fourth issue presented work from different countries, including G. V. Desani, Dan Jacobson, Elemire Zolla, Louis Guilloux and Antoni Slonimski. Edward Hoagland and Lucia Berlin also published their early works in the magazine. The fifth and last issue of the Noble Savage was published in 1962.

References

Defunct literary magazines published in the United States
Magazines established in 1960
Magazines disestablished in 1962
Magazines published in Cleveland